Neil Bennett (or similar) may refer to:
Neil Bennett (footballer, born 1980), English footballer
Neil Bennett (footballer, born 1971), Scottish footballer
Neil Bennett (rugby union) (born 1951), rugby union player for England
Neil Bennett (politician) (born 1958), Australian politician
Neil Bennett, a character in the film You May Be Next
Neal Bennett (White Collar), a character in the TV series White Collar